Usha Srinivasan (born 16 July 1962), more commonly known as Usha, is an Indian film classical dancer specialising in kuchipudi. She was born in a Tamil family. Her father, P. Srinivasan, is a Veda pandit.

Early life
Srinivasan is from Hyderabad, Telangana. She was trained under the kuchipudi dance masters Pasumarthi Sheshubabu, Bhagavatula Sethuram, Uma Ramarao, Chinta Aadinarayana Sharma and Vedantam Radhe Sharma. She was inspired in kuchipudi dance by the legendary Kuchipudi dancers Shobha Naidu and Raja and Radha Reddy. Her mother is also a classical dancer specialised in bharatanatyam.

She did an MA in kuchipudi dance through Potti Sreeramulu Telugu University in Hyderabad. She emerged as an independent performer and choreographer in her twenties and runs a dance school named Sree Raja Rajeswari Arts Academy in Tirupathi. She also works as a kuchipudi lecturer at Tirumal Tirupathi Devasthanam. In 2005, she received a doctorate in Kangundi Kuppam Veedhi Natakam - Kuchipudi Bhagavatham-Tunanathmaka Pariseelana.

Performing career
Srinivasan is an accomplished kuchipudi dancer. She started performing at a young age. Her poised ability to hold difficult balancing poses along with her finely honed sense of rhythm can easily dazzle audiences.  In 2006. she performed in the USA organized and conducted by Raaja Raajeswari Arts Academy of Hyderabad.

Awards

 Natyamayuri Award
 State and national level award
 National scholarship for young artists
 Sangeeta Nataka Akademi Bismillah Khan Yuva Puraskar for dedication towards kuchipudi dance

Dance performance details

References

External links

 https://www.youtube.com/watch?v=5iBbB3qpMR4
 http://www.tirumala.org/EducationalTrust.aspx 
 http://events.fullhyderabad.com/sri-siddhi-vinayaka-vijayam-a-kuchipudi-ballet-by-dr-usharani-and-troupe/2006-august/tickets-dates-videos-reviews-16958-1.html

Artists from Chennai
Telugu people
Living people
1966 births
Kuchipudi exponents
Indian female classical dancers
Performers of Indian classical dance
Dancers from Tamil Nadu
Women artists from Tamil Nadu